Rafael de Mendizábal Allende (10 August 1927 – 10 March 2023) was a Spanish judge. He served as the first president of the Audiencia Nacional from 1977 to 1986, and again from 1991 to 1992 and was a judge of the Constitutional Court from 1992 to 2001.

De Mendizábal died on 10 March 2023, at the age of 95.

References

1927 births
2023 deaths
20th-century Spanish judges
Spanish politicians
People from Jaén, Spain
Knights Grand Cross of the Order of Isabella the Catholic
Complutense University of Madrid alumni